Adam Astill is an English actor, known for his roles as Simon Bennett in the BBC television drama series Mistresses (2008–2010), Dan Hamilton in the BBC medical drama Holby City (2011–2012), Anthony Harker in the BBC soap opera Doctors (2016) and Luke Browning in the BBC soap opera EastEnders (2017).

Filmography

Film

Television

Awards and nominations

References

External links
 

English male soap opera actors
Living people
Place of birth missing (living people)
Year of birth missing (living people)